Lake Poukawa is a small shallow hardwater lake in the Hawke's Bay Region,  North Island, New Zealand. It is located about 20 km south-west of Hastings, New Zealand, close to the settlement of Te Hauke. It is the largest lake lying within a peatland in the active tectonic Poukawa depression (or Poukawa Basin), between the Raukawa Range and Kaokaoroa Range of central Hawke's Bay. Its maximal depth is less than one metre and its diameter is ca. 1.5 km. It was deeper in the past (about 2.5 metre) but it was artificially drained after the 1931 Hawke's Bay earthquake. Lake Poukawa became a well-known paleontological site in 1956 when paleontologist Russell Price began with his excavations in the lacustrine deposits. Lake Poukawa had a species rich Pleistocene/Holocene waterfowl fauna. More than 13,400 anatid bones were unearthed at this site since 1956. Extinct birds found at Lake Poukawa include Biziura delautouri, Oxyura vantetsi, Mergus australis, Chenonetta finschi, Pachyornis geranoides, Ixobrychus novaezelandiae, Gallinula hodgenorum, Fulica prisca, Malacorhynchus scarletti, and Cnemiornis gracilis.

Twelve km south of Lake Poukawa is the Te Aute swamp which is known for its moa fossils and tracks. Lake Poukawa is drained by the Poukawa Stream, which flows north-eastward through the Pekapeka Wetland and eventually into the Clive River.

References

Worthy, T. H. (2004): The Holocene fossil waterfowl fauna of Lake Poukawa, North Island, New Zealand (PDF full text, Online, 652 kilobytes)
Harper, M. A., Howorth, R. & McLeod, M. (1986): Late Holocene diatoms in Lake Poukawa: effects of airfall tephra and changes in depth (PDF full text, Online)
McGlone, M. S. (1978): Journal of the Royal Society of New Zealand - Forest Destruction by early Polynesians, Lake Poukawa, Hawkes Bay, New Zealand Online

External links
Map Showing Location of Lake Poukawa in Hawke's Bay

Poukawa
Poukawa
Paleontological sites of New Zealand